Pedro Ferrer Mula (1908 - date of death unknown) was a Cuban footballer that played in Iberia Havana.

International career
He represented Cuba at the 1938 FIFA World Cup in France. In his only match against Sweden, Ferrer did not score a goal.

Honours
International
Central American and Caribbean Games Gold Medal (1): 1930

References

External links
 

1908 births
Year of death missing
Association football forwards
Cuban footballers
Cuba international footballers
1938 FIFA World Cup players
Central American and Caribbean Games gold medalists for Cuba
Competitors at the 1930 Central American and Caribbean Games
Central American and Caribbean Games medalists in football